Suzanne Storrs (April 13, 1934 – January 25, 1995), born Suzanne Storrs Poulton and later known by her married name Suzanne Pincus, was a former Miss Utah and an American television actress, who appeared in sixteen television series between 1954 and 1961, usually as the beautiful leading lady.

Life and career
Storrs was in many shows during her 1950s and 1960s television career including Maverick with James Garner (in an episode entitled "Guatemala City"), Wanted Dead or Alive with Steve McQueen (in "To the Victor"), Sugarfoot (in "Trouble at Sand Springs"), two episodes of The Untouchables, 77 Sunset Strip, Hawaiian Eye, The Phil Silvers Show, Armstrong Circle Theatre, Lawman, U.S. Steel Hour and The DuPont Show of the Month (in "The Scarlet Pimpernel"), and played recurring character "Janet Halloran" in nine episodes of the original 1958-59 version of Naked City with John McIntire.

Personal life
The young actress won the Miss Utah title in 1955. In 1967, she married financier Lionel Pincus, a co-founder of the multibillion-dollar private equity firm Warburg Pincus. They donated $10 million to Columbia University in 1995.  She and Pincus had two sons, Henry and Matthew. She became a director of various charitable organizations and died after a lengthy illness at age 60 in 1995. Her husband died at age 78 in 2009.

Selected Television

References

External links
 
  Suzanne Storrs Pincus obituary article in the New York Times.
 Naked City article in the Museum of Broadcast Communications.
 "The Scarlet Pimpernel" on The Dupont Show of the Month

1934 births
1995 deaths
American television actresses
People from Provo, Utah
Actresses from Utah
20th-century American actresses